Casella Family Brands is a family-owned wine company based in Australia. Its most well-known brandname is [yellow tail].

History
Filippo and Maria Casella immigrated to Australia in 1957. They bought land and established a vineyard at Yenda in the Riverina region of New South Wales in 1965, followed by their own winery in 1969. Their son, John Casella took over the business in 1994. [yellow tail] was introduced in 2001 and now sells over 12.5 million cases of wine in 50 countries annually.

Brand names
As well as the [yellow tail] brand, Casella Family Brands produces and sells several other wine labels, including:
Brand’s Laira (Coonawarra)
Peter Lehmann Wines (Barossa Valley)
Young Brute (Wrattonbully)
Morris of Rutherglen (Rutherglen)
Casella
 Shaw Family Vintners (Currency Creek)

References

Australian wine
Privately held companies of Australia
Family-owned companies of Australia